The chief justice of Tanzania is the highest post in the judicial system of Tanzania. The chief justice is appointed by the president and presides over the Court of Appeal of Tanzania.

History
After the First World War, the former German-governed colony Tanganyika was put under British authority in the Treaty of Versailles in 1919. A year later, a High Court was established by an Order in Council and the post of the chief justice was formed. Tanganyika became independent in 1961 and after a year was transformed into a republic.

In 1964 it merged with Zanzibar into the United Republic of Tanganyika and Zanzibar, which later in that year was renamed to United Republic of Tanzania. Despite the unification both parts of the new state retained their formed judicial system. The Court of Appeal for Tanzania, which has law jurisdiction over the entire state, was inaugurated in 1979.

Chief justices of Tanganyika
 1920–1924: William Morris Carter
 1924–1929: William Alison Russell
 1929–1934: Joseph Alfred Sheridan
 1934–1936: Sidney Solomon Abrahams
 1936–1939: Llewelyn Chisholm Dalton
 1939–1945: Ambrose Henry Webb
 1945–1951: George Graham Paul
 1951–1955: Herbert Charles Fahie Cox
 1955–1960: Edward John Davies
 1960–1964: Ralph Windham

Chief justices of Tanzania
 1964–1965: Ralph Windham
 1965–1971: Philip Telford Georges
 1971–1977: Augustine Saidi
 1977–2000: Francis Lucas Nyalali
 2000–2007: Barnabas A. Samatta
 2007–2010: Augustino Ramadhani
 2010–2017: Mohamed Chande Othman
 Since 2017: Ibrahim Hamis Juma

See also
Chief Justice of Zanzibar

Notes

References

Chief justices of Tanzania